Henry Périer is a French art critic, PhD in art history and independent curator.

He is the biograph of Pierre Restany, the French art critic, founder of the movement New Realism (Arman, César, Raymond Hains, Yves Klein, Niki de Saint-Phalle, Jacques Villeglé, etc.)

Curator of the year of China in France 2004, he organized an exhibition including 39 Chinese contemporary artists such as Zhang Xiaogang, Wang Guangyi, Yue Minjun, Fang Lijun, Yang Shaobin at the Museum of Contemporary Art of Marseille. Scientific advisor of the retrospective Zeng Fanzhi at the Musée d'Art moderne de la ville de Paris (October 2013 - February 2014).

Publications
 Jacques Villeglé – Pierre Restany, un demi-siècle de jeu existentiel dans l’art, Entretien de Jacques Villeglé par Henry Périer, catalogue de l'exposition Jacques Villeglé au musée d’art contemporain de Marseille [mac], 2012 
 Zhao Bandi Fashion Show, Henry Périer, Performance at the Palais de Tokyo, Guy Pieters Editions, mars 2009
 Bernard Buffet, Rétrospective at the Centre de la Vieille Charité in Marseille, Henry Périer, Editions Indigène, 2009
 China Gold, Henry Périer, Editions Gallimard, 2008
 Bernard Buffet et la Provence, Henry Périer, Editions Palantines, Paris, 2007
 Pierre Restany, l'alchimiste de l'art, Henry Périer, Editions Cercle d'Art, Paris, 1998

Sources
 https://www.youtube.com/watch?v=NnPCNWlNAHM Interview of Zeng Fanzhi and Henry Périer, exhibition at Musée d'Art Moderne of Paris, "L'Invité", TV5MONDE, October 2013
 El comissari de Venècia busca artistes “espectaculars” i que “defensin l’obra”
 Henry Périer, Chinese contemporary art in French curator's eyes, p. 56-57, Harper's Bazaar, May 2011
 Henry Perier "L'Invité" TV5MONDE spéciale FIAC, 25 octobre 2009

References

Living people
Year of birth missing (living people)